Konda Bhaskar Arun Karthik (born 15 February 1986 in Walajapet, Tamil Nadu) is an Indian cricketer, who currently plays for Puducherry and was a member of the Royal Challengers Bangalore squad. Karthik is a right-hand batsman and leg-spin bowler. He was a Wicket-keeper batsman for Royal Challengers Bangalore.

Karthik made his List A debut for Sri Lankan side Badureliya Sports Club in November 2007, scoring 38. He was an ever-present in the Badureliya one-day team during the 2007–08 season and finished as their highest runscorer.

In November 2008 Karthik made his first-class debut for Tamil Nadu against Karnataka, opening the innings he scored 149, sharing in a 246-run stand with Vidyut Sivaramakrishnan.

For the 2019–20 Ranji Trophy tournament, he moved from Kerala to Puducherry cricket team.

References

External links
Cricinfo Profile
CricketArchive Profile

1986 births
Living people
Indian cricketers
Tamil Nadu cricketers
Assam cricketers
Royal Challengers Bangalore cricketers
Badureliya Sports Club cricketers
South Zone cricketers
Chennai Super Kings cricketers
India Red cricketers
Victoria Sporting Club cricketers
Wicket-keepers
Pondicherry cricketers